Qianzhou or Qian Prefecture (虔州) was a zhou (prefecture) in imperial China centering on modern Ganzhou, Jiangxi, China. It existed (intermittently) from 589 to 1153.

Geography
The administrative region of Qianzhou in the Tang dynasty falls within modern Ganzhou in southern Jiangxi. It probably includes modern: 
Ganzhou
Gan County

References
 

Prefectures of the Sui dynasty
Prefectures of the Tang dynasty
Prefectures of the Song dynasty
Prefectures of Yang Wu
Prefectures of Southern Tang
Former prefectures in Jiangxi